Rhys Haydn Williams (14 July 1930 – 27 January 1993), born in Cwmllynfell, was a Welsh rugby union lock forward who gained 23 caps for Wales and ten consecutive caps for the British Lions. At club level he played primarily for Llanelli RFC, captaining them for a season. He also represented the Barbarians becoming the most capped Welsh representative of the club. In his later life he became a sports administrator, including the role of vice-president of the Welsh Rugby Union. Rugby historian John Griffiths described Williams as "the finest line-jumper in the world" and "the most accomplished British lock of the 1950s".

Personal history
Williams was born in the small village of Cwmllynfell in 1930. He was educated at Ystalyfera Grammar School and later matriculated to University College, Cardiff. After graduating he joined the RAF as an education officer. On leaving the forces he later becoming a research chemist for the Steel Company of Wales, and finished his professional career in educational administration as an Assistant Director of Education for Mid Glamorgan. He died in 1993 in Whitchurch, Cardiff.

Welsh captain, British Lion, Barbarian 
While in the RAF, Willimas played in the Inter-Services tournament and for Combined Services. He made his debut in club rugby for Llanelli at the age of nineteen, going on to captain the club in the 1957–58 season. He made his debut for Wales in 1954 against Ireland and played at international level until 1960, captaining Wales against England in that year. He played for the British and Irish Lions, going on the 1955 British Lions tour to South Africa and the 1959 British Lions tour to Australia and New Zealand. On these tours he played in ten consecutive test matches. He also toured Canada and South Africa with the Barbarians. Between 1954 and 1959 Williams played 22 matches for the Barbarians, a record number of games for a Welsh player. In the final test against New Zealand in 1959, he won six consecutive line-outs in a critical period of the second half to deny New Zealand the chance to equalise. He was the only forward to be named as 'Player of the Year' in New Zealand during the 1959–1960 season.

Andrew Bennett in his book Welsh Rugby Heroes includes R. H. Williams at No. 4 in his selection of the "all-time greatest" Welsh XV.

Notes

Bibliography
 

 
 

1930 births
1993 deaths
Barbarian F.C. players
Bristol Bears players
British & Irish Lions rugby union players from Wales
Combined Services rugby union players
Llanelli RFC players
Royal Air Force officers
Rugby union locks
Rugby union players from Cwmllynfell
Wales international rugby union players
Wales rugby union captains
Welsh rugby union players